The communauté de communes des Terroirs d’Angillon was created on December 29, 2000 and is located in the Cher  département  of the Centre-Val de Loire region of France. It was created in January 2001. It was merged into the new Communauté de communes Terres du Haut Berry in January 2017.

The Communauté de communes comprised the following communes:

Les Aix-d'Angillon
Azy
Brécy
Moulins-sur-Yèvre
Parassy
Rians
Sainte-Solange
Soulangis

References 

Terroirs d'Angillon